Stojan Gjuroski (born November 6, 1991) is a Macedonian professional basketball player for Ourense in Spain. He graduated from Louisiana Tech University in 2014, where he played for four years. He is also a member of the Macedonian national basketball team since 2013.

College

|-
| align="left" | 2010–11
| align="left" | Louisiana Tech
| 1 || 0 || 12.0 || .333 || .000 || .000 || 2.00 || 0.00 || 0.00 || 1.00 || 2.00
|-
| align="left" | 2011–12
| align="left" | Louisiana Tech
| 8 || 0 || 4.1 || .200 || .000 || .000 || 0.88 || 0.25 || 0.12 || 0.00 || 0.50
|-
| align="left" | 2012–13
| align="left" | Louisiana Tech
| 15 || 0 || 3.5 || .350 || 375 || .500 || 0.13 || 0.00 || 0.00 || 0.07 || 1.40
|-
| align="left" | 2013–14
| align="left" | Louisiana Tech
| 25 || 0 || 4.3 || .226 || .182 || .333 || 1.08 || 0.24 || 0.08 || 0.00 || 0.80

References

External links
 abaliga.com
 basketball.realgm.com
 latechsports.com 
 ekipa.mk

1991 births
Living people
BC Levski Sofia players
CB Peñas Huesca players
KK MZT Skopje players
KK Rabotnički players
Life Center Academy alumni
Louisiana Tech Bulldogs basketball players
Macedonian expatriate basketball people in Spain
Macedonian men's basketball players
Melilla Baloncesto players
People from Gostivar
Power forwards (basketball)
Small forwards